First Wives Club may refer to:

 The First Wives Club, a 1992 novel by Olivia Goldsmith
 The First Wives Club, a 1996 American comedy film based on the novel
 First Wives Club (musical), a 2009 musical based on the film
 First Wives Club (TV series), a 2019 American TV series based on the film
 First Wives' Club, a 2007 South Korean drama series